Battery E, 2nd Illinois Light Artillery Regiment, was an artillery battery that served in the Union Army during the American Civil War.

Service
The battery was organized St. Louis, Missouri as Schwartz's Missouri Battery and mustered in for a three year enlistment on August 20, 1861.

The battery was attached to District of Cairo and 1st Brigade, 1st Division, District of Cairo, to February 1862. 3rd Brigade, 1st Division, District of West Tennessee, to April 1862. Artillery, 1st Division, Army of the Tennessee, to July 1862. 1st Division, District of Jackson, Tennessee, to November 1862. 3rd Division, XIII Corps, Department of the Tennessee, to December 1863. Artillery, 4th Division, XVII Corps, to January 1863. Artillery, 4th Division, XVI Corps, to July 1863. Artillery, 3rd Division, XIII Corps, Department of the Tennessee, to August 1863, and Department of the Gulf to November 1863. Plaquemine, District of Baton Rouge, Louisiana, Department of the Gulf, to June 1864. Defenses of New Orleans, Louisiana, to September 1864.

Battery E mustered out of service on September 29, 1864.

Detailed service
Duty in northern Missouri (1 section) September 6 to December 29, 1861. Battery ordered to Cairo, Illinois, September 14. Duty at Cairo, Fort Holt, and Jeffersonville, Indiana, until February 1862. Expedition to Bloomfield, Missouri, November 1, 1861. Expedition into Kentucky January 10-21, 1862. Operations against Fort Henry, Tennessee, February 2-6. Investment and capture of Fort Donelson, Tennessee, February 12-16. Moved to Savannah, then to Pittsburg Landing, Tennessee, March. Battle of Shiloh, April 6-7. Advance on and siege of Corinth, Mississippi, April 29-May 30. March to Purdy, Bethel, and Jackson June 5-8. Duty at Jackson until November. Action at Britton's Lane September 1. Grant's Central Mississippi Campaign November 1862 to January 1863. Reconnaissance from Lagrange November 8-9, 1862. March to Moscow, Tennessee, December 24, 1862 to January 12, 1863, and duty there guarding Memphis & Charleston Railroad until March 1863. Moved to Memphis, Tennessee, and duty there until May. Moved to Vicksburg, Mississippi, May 12-22. Siege of Vicksburg May 22-July 4. Advance on Jackson, Mississippi, July 5-10, Siege of Jackson July 10-17. Assault on Jackson July 12. Ordered to New Orleans, Louisiana, August 13. Duty at Carrollton, Brashear, and Berwick City until October. Western Louisiana Campaign October 3-November 30. Duty at Plaquemine, Louisiana, District of Baton Rouge, Louisiana, until June 1864, and at New Orleans, Louisiana, until September.

Casualties
The battery lost a total of 17 men during service; 1 officer and 6 enlisted men killed or mortally wounded, 10 enlisted men died of disease.

Commanders
 Captain Adolph Schwartz - promoted to major
 Captain George Gumbart - resigned July 15, 1863
 Captain George Lewis Nispel - resigned August 16, 1864

See also

 List of Illinois Civil War units
 Illinois in the Civil War

References
 Dyer, Frederick H. A Compendium of the War of the Rebellion (Des Moines, IA: Dyer Pub. Co.), 1908.
Attribution

External links
 Roster of Battery E, 2nd Illinois Light Artillery transcribed by Jim Willison
 Battery E, 2nd Illinois Artillery monument at Vicksburg

Military units and formations established in 1861
Military units and formations disestablished in 1864
Units and formations of the Union Army from Illinois
1861 establishments in Illinois
Artillery units and formations of the American Civil War